"Let My Love Open the Door" is a song written and performed by Pete Townshend from his 1980 album Empty Glass. That year, it reached number nine on the Billboard Hot 100. It peaked at number five on RPM's Top 100 singles chart.

Background
Although Townshend is a devotee to the religious guru Meher Baba, he claimed in the liner notes of his Anthology CD that "Jesus sings" on the track.  Cash Box called it a "joyous, blissful tune [that] features a stirring keyboard-synthesizer melody and multi-tracked high harmonies." Record World called it a "timeless pop-rocker."

"Let My Love Open the Door" was released as the second single from Empty Glass in Britain, where it was backed with the non-album tracks "Classified" and "Greyhound Girl." The song was a minor British hit, reaching number 46. The song saw more success when it was released as the debut single from Empty Glass in America, where the song reached number nine. It was Pete Townshend's only solo top 10 hit on the Billboard Hot 100, but the Who's song "I Can See for Miles", which was written by Townshend, reached the same position on the chart 13 years earlier.

Initially, Townshend's manager despised the track due to it "not sounding like Townshend," and wanted it to be removed from Empty Glass. However, upon the song's chart success, his manager called to apologize.

Despite the song's critical and commercial success, Pete Townshend did not consider it one of his best songs. He told Rolling Stone in an interview that "Let My Love Open the Door" was "just a ditty," also claiming that he preferred his minor U.S. hit "A Little Is Enough" from the same album.

In 1996, Townshend released a new version of the song, called "the E. Cola mix", turning the song into a ballad. This version appeared in different television shows and film soundtracks.

Personnel
 Pete Townshend: vocals, guitars, synthesizers
 John "Rabbit" Bundrick: keyboards
 Simon Phillips: drums
 Tony Butler: bass guitar
 Ted Jensen: mastering engineer

Chart performance

Weekly charts

Year-end charts

In popular culture
The song has been used frequently in film, most notably the comedy genre, often as trailer music for Jerry Maguire and How Do You Know. It has been featured in the closing credits for Mr. Deeds, Look Who's Talking, Jersey Girl, Along Came Polly, Red Dog, Old Dogs, Put Grandma in the Freezer, and The Adam Project, respectively. In Dan in Real Life, the song is performed by Steve Carell and Dane Cook and is covered by Sondre Lerche for the film's soundtrack. In 2004, the song was used in commercials for JCPenney during the holiday season. In 2021, it was used in the "All Night Long" episode of the Apple TV+ series Acapulco during the last scene and end credits.

References

1980 songs
1980 singles
Pete Townshend songs
Songs written by Pete Townshend
Atco Records singles
Song recordings produced by Chris Thomas (record producer)
British new wave songs